is a railway station in the city of  Ōshū, Iwate, Japan, operated by East Japan Railway Company (JR East).

Lines
Maesawa Station is served by the Tōhoku Main Line, and is located 459.9 rail kilometers from the official starting point of the line at Tokyo Station.

Station layout
The station has a single side platform and an island platform connected to the elevated station building by a footbridge. The station has a "Midori no Madoguchi" staffed ticket office.

Platforms

History
Maesawa Station opened on 1 November 1890. It was absorbed into the JR East network upon the privatization of the Japanese National Railways (JNR) on 1 April 1987. A new station building was completed in 2005.

Passenger statistics
In fiscal 2018, the station was used by an average of 507 passengers daily (boarding passengers only).

Surrounding area
Maesawa Post Office
Maesawa High School

See also
 List of Railway Stations in Japan

References

External links

  

Railway stations in Iwate Prefecture
Tōhoku Main Line
Railway stations in Japan opened in 1890
Ōshū, Iwate
Stations of East Japan Railway Company